The Adda River is a river of South Sudan, a tributary of the Bahr al-Arab.

The river flows through the Western Bahr el Ghazal, South Sudan. 
It joins the Umbelasha River opposite the town of Radom, Sudan, to form the Bahr al-Arab, which defines the border between South Sudan and Sudan.

References

Rivers of South Sudan
Bahr el Ghazal
Nile basin